The Bushwacker is a cocktail invented in 1975 at the Ship's Store, Sapphire Pub at Sapphire Village in St. Thomas, Virgin Islands.
It is similar to a creamy, chocolate piña colada.  The original recipe called for Vodka, Kahlua, Dark Crème de Cacao, Coco Lopez (cream of coconut), a splash of Triple sec and milk that's spun in a blender with ice and topped with a grating of fresh nutmeg.  However, the recipe now has as many variations as there are gin joints or bartenders. The quantity of vodka or rum, which lends the drink most of its alcohol, can be varied making the drink anywhere between 40% and 75% alcohol or it can be completely left out for a low-alcohol beverage. Fruit can also be added to the cocktail as another seasonal variation to an otherwise basic drink.

History
The Bushwacker was invented at the Ship's Store/Sapphire Pub in Sapphire Village, St Thomas, U.S. Virgin Islands in the spring of 1975 by bartender Angie Conigliaro (cousin to Tony of the Boston Red Sox) and Tom Brokamp the restaurant's manager.  It was promptly named after a visiting guest's dog, Bushwack, an Afghan Hound.  The dog's owners were flight attendants and rarely traveled without their 4-legged companion.  After spreading quickly throughout the Virgin Islands, the invention was soon brought back stateside by bartenders from Florida after visiting the islands.  Many bars throughout Florida experimented with the recipe creating their own versions and doing much to popularize it in the states. 

Bushwacker was first bottled and mass-produced by Bushwacker Spirits of Sarasota Florida in 2020. 

Since 1986 there has been an annual Bushwacker Festival held at Quietwater Beach on Pensacola Beach, FL to celebrate the drink and its celebrity status.

In politics
U.S. President Barack Obama was photographed by the Associated Press drinking a bushwhacker at an Orange Beach, Alabama restaurant on July 15, 2010 while touring the areas affected by the BP Deepwater Horizon oil spill.

See also
 List of cocktails

References

Cocktails with rum
Creamy cocktails
Cocktails with coconut
Cocktails
Cocktails with vodka
Cocktails with Irish cream
Cocktails with triple sec or curaçao
Cocktails with coffee liqueur
Cocktails with milk